Steven Krueger (born May 25, 1989) is an American actor. He is known for his roles as Coach Ben Scott on the hit Showtime series Yellowjackets and as Josh Rosza on CW's The Originals

Life and career 
Krueger was born in Appleton, Wisconsin and grew up in Sarasota, Florida. He made his acting debut shortly after moving to Los Angeles in late 2009 in an episode of The CW's 90210.  Over the next few years he made a number of guest star and recurring appearances in notable television shows like Pretty Little Liars, Workaholics, Parenthood and Two And a Half Men.

In 2013, Krueger was cast in a recurring role on The Originals, The CW's spinoff of hit show The Vampire Diaries. His character, Josh, was the first gay character introduced on the series  and was originally slated to appear in three episodes  However, Josh quickly became a fan favorite and at the end of 2013, Krueger was named one of TV's Top Scene Stealers of the year by E! News. He was promoted to a series regular role and remained an integral part of the show through its final season in 2018.

Since the finale of The Originals, Krueger continued to work on a number of television shows. In November 2019 it was announced that he was joining the cast of the Showtime pilot Yellowjackets, directed by Karyn Kusama, as a series regular.  Krueger plays Ben Scott, the assistant coach of the high school girls' soccer team that is stranded in the mountains after surviving a plane crash 25 years ago. Yellowjackets debuted in November 2021. Also in 2021, Krueger played a recurring role as Heath on the third season of Roswell, New Mexico.

Filmography

References

External links 

 
 
 
https://www.abc4.com/dailydish/cw-roswell-star-dishes-on-new-season-and-love-drama-storyline/
 https://www.naludamagazine.com/interview-with-yellowjackets-and-roswell-actor-steven-krueger/
https://medium.com/authority-magazine/rising-star-steven-krueger-on-the-five-things-you-need-to-shine-in-the-entertainment-industry-fe1d4cc926ee
https://www.abqjournal.com/2418713/alien-evolution-actor-enjoyed-filming-role-of-intruder-in-third-season-of-roswell-new-mexico.html

Living people
People from Appleton, Wisconsin
University of Virginia alumni
Male actors from Wisconsin
American male film actors
American male television actors
American people of English descent
American people of German descent
21st-century American male actors
1989 births